Stephen David John Gilbert (born 6 November 1976) is a British Liberal Democrat politician. He was elected at the 2010 general election the Member of Parliament (MP) for the new constituency of St Austell and Newquay,
but lost his seat at the 2015 general election to the Conservative Party candidate Steve Double. He now teaches politics at Highgate School, having previously taught history and politics at the King's School, Worcester.

Background
Gilbert was born in Truro, Cornwall and was educated at schools in Lostwithiel, Fowey and St Austell. He went on to study International Politics at University of Wales, Aberystwyth and completed a master's degree, also in International Politics, at the London School of Economics.

He is a former Restormel Borough Councillor, whose area overlaps considerably with the constituency, and a former Haringey Borough Councillor. Briefly working in the Westminster office of the then Liberal Democrat MP, Lembit Öpik, and he also worked as a public affairs consultant for a financial services company in London.

Gilbert was one of 24 openly gay MPs in the House of Commons during the 2010–15 term.

Parliamentary career
He was first elected to Parliament in 2010 as MP for the new constituency of St Austell and Newquay with a majority of 1,312.

On being elected, he was appointed to the Select Committee for Communities and Local Government. He has also served as a Junior Government Whip and as chairman of the All Party Parliamentary Group on Housing.

In September 2012 he was appointed Parliamentary Private Secretary to the Energy & Climate Change Secretary of State Ed Davey.

He was also a member of the Public Bill Committee for the Defence Reform Act 2014.

In 2013 he helped rescue a woman from the River Thames, throwing a lifebuoy after spotting what he had first thought was a body floating past the House of Commons terrace, as he enjoyed a cigarette.

References

External links
 Stephen Gilbert MP official website
 Column archives at the Liberal Democrat Voice
 

1976 births
Alumni of Aberystwyth University
Alumni of the London School of Economics
Councillors in Cornwall
People from Truro
Councillors in the London Borough of Haringey
Gay politicians
English LGBT politicians
Liberal Democrats (UK) MPs for English constituencies
Liberal Democrats (UK) councillors
Living people
Members of the Parliament of the United Kingdom for constituencies in Cornwall
UK MPs 2010–2015
LGBT members of the Parliament of the United Kingdom
British educators